RVEEH may refer to:

Royal Victoria Eye and Ear Hospital, a public teaching hospital in Dublin, Ireland
Royal Victorian Eye and Ear Hospital, a public teaching hospital in East Melbourne, Australia